Damien Joyce (born 1980) is an Irish sportsperson. He played with the Galway senior inter-county hurling team, captaining them in 2011. He plays for his local club Cappataggle.

References
 Damen Joyce on Hurlingstats.com
 Galway GAA honours

 

1980 births
Living people
Cappataggle hurlers
Galway inter-county hurlers
Connacht inter-provincial hurlers
Hurling selectors